Yuriy Bushman (born 14 May 1990) is a Ukrainian professional footballer who plays as a midfielder for Kazakhstani side Kyzylzhar.

Club career
Bushman is a product of Youth School Vidradnyi Kyiv.

Before his debut for FC Arsenal on 2 March 2013, he spent more than 80 matches for junior team in the Ukrainian Premier Reserve League.

References

External links
Profile at FFU Official Site (Ukr)

1990 births
Living people
Ukrainian footballers
Association football midfielders
FC Arsenal Kyiv players
FC Zirka Kropyvnytskyi players
FC Naftovyk-Ukrnafta Okhtyrka players
FC Prykarpattia Ivano-Frankivsk (2004) players
FC Cherkashchyna players
PFC Sumy players
FK Kauno Žalgiris players
FC Kyzylzhar players
Ukrainian Premier League players
Ukrainian First League players
A Lyga players
Kazakhstan Premier League players
Ukrainian expatriate footballers
Ukrainian expatriate sportspeople in Lithuania
Expatriate footballers in Lithuania
Ukrainian expatriate sportspeople in Kazakhstan
Expatriate footballers in Kazakhstan
Footballers from Kyiv